Shantanu Gupta is an Indian author and political analyst. He is also the founder of The Ramayana School. Gupta has authored six books including Bharatiya Janata Party: Past, Present and Future— Story of World's Largest Political Party and The Monk Who Became Chief Minister which is biography of the 22nd and current Chief Minister of Uttar Pradesh - Yogi Adityanath. Now Gupta has written the sequel of Yogi Adityanath's biography The Monk Who Transformed Uttar Pradesh.

Early life and education
Shantanu Gupta was born on 7 February 1979 in Bareilly, a town in Uttar Pradesh and raised in Rishikesh, Uttarakhand, where his father worked in the public sector company Indian Drugs and Pharmaceuticals Limited (IDPL). He did his schooling from Kendriya Vidyalaya and subsequently studied engineering degree at G. B. Pant University of Agriculture and Technology. He thereafter studied Management at XLRI, Jamshedpur and worked as a consultant for many years in India and abroad. In 2008 he went to the Institute of Development Studies (IDS), University of Sussex, United Kingdom, to do his Masters in Governance and Development.

Career
Gupta started his career with a CAD/CAM software company in Hyderabad named Intergraph and over the years worked for different organizations like Quark, Geometric Software, Mercedes Benz, Amdocs and Wipro. Later he left corporate life and started his social sector career with Naandi Foundation. Under Naandi, he helped manage projects related to remedial education interventions in Andhra Pradesh, Maharashtra & New Delhi. He also worked with UNICEF for its Integrated District Approach (IDA) project in Bundelkhand, Uttar Pradesh. Subsequently, he became the part of Centre for Civil Society (CCS), a think tank. Gupta has been a proponent of private schools with a lower fee option, vis a vis government run free and subsidized schools.

He is also the communication advisor to Baba Ramdev and alumni of XLRI Jamshedpur and Institute of Development Studies (IDS), University of Sussex, (United Kingdom) in India.

Gupta had left his corporate career and became an author and he writes on political & policy issues.

The Ramayana School 
Gupta has founded The Ramayana School, which describes itself as "an endeavor to explore and contextualize the life lessons present in Ramayana to the present times.

Works
Gupta has authored the India's Football Dream, Education Policy in India: Voice Choice and Incentives (2015), Man Ki Baat and Uttar Pradesh - Vikas Ki Prateeksha Mein.

Gupta wrote The Monk Who Became Chief Minister, biography of 22nd Chief Minister of Uttar Pradesh-Yogi Adityanath. Book was published in 2017 by Bloomsbury Publishing. He wrote another book The Monk Who Transformed Uttar Pradesh which was published in 2021 by Garuda Prakashan.

See also
 List of Indian writers

References

External links 
 

1979 births
English-language writers from India
Indian male writers
Living people
21st-century Indian novelists
Novelists from Uttar Pradesh
Activists from Uttar Pradesh
21st-century Indian male writers
XLRI – Xavier School of Management alumni